Alberta Provincial Highway No. 22, commonly referred to as Highway 22 and officially named Cowboy Trail, is a  highway in the Canadian province of Alberta. It generally parallels Highway 2, beginning in the foothills of southern Alberta at Highway 3 near Lundbreck Falls.  It proceeds north along the eastern slopes of the Rocky Mountains passing through the foothills and ranch country to the aspen parkland of northern Alberta, ending at Highway 18 near Mayerthorpe.

Cowboy Trail continues south and east of Highway 22 by following Highway 3 to Pincher Creek, Highway 6 to Waterton Lakes National Park, and Highway 5 to Cardston.

Alberta Transportation is currently constructing a new interchange at the over-saturated intersection of Highways 22 and 1A in Cochrane.  There are also long-term plans for twinning from Bragg Creek to the north end of Cochrane, and the implementation of passing lanes near the highway's south end.

Route description

Highway 22 begins as a two-lane rural highway in the Municipal District of Pincher Creek No. 9 near Lundbreck Falls at Highway 3, the Crowsnest Highway.  It proceeds north across increasingly flatter terrain of the foothills, parallel to the Oldman River, and then crosses it before entering the Municipal District of Ranchland No. 66.  The highway winds to the east of the Black Heritage Rangeland Natural Area, intersecting Highway 520 which branches east to meet Highway 2 at Claresholm.  Highway 22 continues north through scenic terrain to the Chain Lakes Reservoir, from which Highway 533 splits east to meet Highway 2 at Nanton.  The highway continues north through Longview, Diamond Valley (made up of the former twin towns of Black Diamond and Turner Valley), and Millarville.  The highway then jogs west at Highway 22X.  Approximately  later, the road turns north again and passes through Bragg Creek where Highway 22X ends.  Highway 22 continues north past the Trans-Canada Highway (Highway 1) west of Calgary, north through the Town of Cochrane, the Hamlet of Cochrane Lake, and the Village of Cremona to Highway 27.

History
The original alignment of Highway 22 started at Highway 2 (Macleod Trail) south of Calgary and travelled west to Priddis, where it turned south to Turner Valley and terminated at Highway 7 in Black Diamond. In the 1970s, the province of Alberta began upgrading a series of roads to form a north-south, all-weather highway west of Highway 2. In , the numbered secondary highway system appeared, with the road between Cochrane and Highway 27 being designated as Highway 922 (the paved section between Cremona and Bottrel became Highway 22) while the road between Priddis and Bragg Creek was briefly designated as Highway 553, becoming Highway 922 in 1975. Throughout the remainder of the 1970s, Highway 922 was extended from Highway 3 in the south to Highway 57 near Drayton Valley in the north. In , all remaining gravel sections of Highway 922 were reclassified as Highway 22, along with a  section of Highway 7 between Black Diamond and Longview, a  section of Highway 57 between Drayton Valley and Entwistle (the remaining  section of Highway 57 became part of Highway 39) and Highway 755 between Highway 16 and Mayerthorpe. Throughout the 1980s, Highway 22 was paved, with all but a small section near Chain Lakes Provincial Park being completed by 1990 (the latter was completed in the mid-1990s).

In 2014, a new  $52 million bridge across the North Saskatchewan River near Drayton Valley was completed, replacing the original bridge which was constructed in 1957.

Future
Alberta Transportation retained Tetra Tech EBA to complete a study in the feasibility of new passing lanes over a  distance of Highway 22 between Highways 3 and 543.  The study was published in August 2011 and determined that passing lanes are justified at several locations, but Alberta Transportation currently has no plans to proceed with the project. In April 2017, Alberta Transportation announced plans for a new interchange at Highway 1A in Cochrane, with the selection of an engineering consultant taking place during the summer and the anticipated start of construction beginning as early as Fall 2019. As part of a separate project, Alberta Transportation completed a long-term study to twin Highway 22 between Cochrane and Highway 8, including replacing the cloverleaf interchange at Highway 1; no timeline has been set for construction.

Major intersections 
From south to north:

References

External links 

The Cowboy Trail's official webpage

022